Hố Nai is a ward located in Biên Hòa city of Đồng Nai province, Vietnam. It has an area of about 3.8km2 and the population in 2017 was 41,922.

References

Bien Hoa